This is a summary of 1906 in music in the United Kingdom.

Events
August – Mary Davies is principal soloist at the National Eisteddfod of Wales.
Summer – Australian composer Percy Grainger begins collecting English folk songs with the aid of a phonograph.
date unknown
Operatic soprano Maggie Teyte makes her public début at a Mozart festival in Paris.
16-year-old Phyllis Dare takes over the leading role in The Belle of Mayfair at the Vaudeville Theatre when Edna May leaves suddenly because of a disagreement with the producer.
Composer Lawrence Wright opens a music shop in his home city of Leicester.

Popular music
"Ye Watchers and Ye Holy Ones" (hymn), with words by Athelstan Riley, first published in The English Hymnal by Oxford University Press, edited by Percy Dearmer and Ralph Vaughan Williams.

Classical music: new works
Granville Bantock – Sappho, nine fragments with a Prelude
Rutland Boughton – Love in Spring, symphonic poem
Frank Bridge 
Three Idylls for String Quartet
String Quartet No. 1 in E minor "Bologna"
Katharine Emily Eggar – Piano Quartet in D minor and major
Edward Elgar – The Kingdom (oratorio)

Opera
 Dame Ethel Smyth & Henry Brewster – The Wreckers

Musical theatre
20 June – See See, with music by Sidney Jones, book by Charles H. Brookfield, and lyrics by Adrian Ross, opens at the Prince of Wales Theatre; it runs for 152 performances.

Births
31 January – Benjamin Frankel, composer (died 1973)
19 February – Grace Williams, composer (died 1977)
13 March – Dave Kaye, pianist (died 1996)
22 April – Eric Fenby, composer, conductor, pianist, organist and teacher, amanuensis of Frederick Delius (died 1997)
9 July – Elisabeth Lutyens, composer (died 2005)
24 August – Walter Braithwaite, composer (died 1991)
4 November – Arnold Cooke, composer (died 1983)

Deaths
9 May – Helen Lemmens-Sherrington, concert and operatic soprano (born 1834)
14 June – George Herbert, organist and composer of hymn tunes (born 1817)
30 December – Eugène Goossens, père, Belgian-born conductor (born 1845)

See also
 1906 in the United Kingdom

References

British Music, 1906 in
Music
British music by year
1900s in British music